Snezhurovo is a rural locality (a village) in Moseyevskoye Rural Settlement, Totemsky District, Vologda Oblast, Russia. The population was 10 as of 2002.

Geography 
Snezhurovo is located 78 km northwest of Totma (the district's administrative centre) by road. Filinskaya is the nearest rural locality.

References 

Rural localities in Tarnogsky District